The Nebraska PGA Championship is a golf tournament that is the championship of the Nebraska section of the PGA of America. Although the Nebraska section was formed in 1929, there were no section championships held until 1954. Jim White, who won the Senior PGA Professional National Championship in 2004, holds the record with 13 wins spanning five decades. Bud Williamson, long-time coach of Tom Watson, won nine times in the 1950s and 1960s. Mike Schuchart, PGA Tour player in 1990s won this tournament eight times.

Winners 

 2022 Ryan Vermeer
 2021 Ryan Vermeer
 2020 Ryan Vermeer
 2019 Ryan Vermeer
 2018 Ryan Vermeer
 2017 Nick Wanderscheid
 2016 Ryan Vermeer
 2015 Nick Wanderscheid
 2014 Nick Wanderscheid
 2013 Jim White
 2012 Chris Wiemers
 2011 Scott Holly
 2010 Jim White
 2009 Jim White
 2008 Mike Schuchart
 2007 Mike Schuchart
 2006 Mike Schuchart
 2005 Mike Schuchart
 2004 Bryan Hughett
 2003 Mike Schuchart
 2002 Mike Schuchart
 2001 Bret Taylor
 2000 Jim White
 1999 Bret Taylor
 1998 Bryan Hughett
 1997 Bret Taylor
 1996 Jim White
 1995 Rennie Sasse
 1994 John Frillman
 1993 Jim White
 1992 Mike Schuchart
 1991 Mike Schuchart
 1990 Mike Antonio
 1989 Jim White
 1988 Charlie Borner
 1987 John Norton
 1986 John Frillman
 1985 Jim White
 1984 Larry Wheeler
 1983 Jim White
 1982 Jim White
 1981 Jim White
 1980 Ron Filipowicz
 1979 Jim White
 1978 Jim White
 1977 Larry Wheeler
 1976 Dave Oliphant
 1975 John Frillman
 1974 John Frillman
 1973 John Frillman
 1972 Jerry Fisher
 1971 Merle Backlund
 1970 John Frillman
 1969 Merle Backlund
 1968 Merle Backlund
 1967 John Frillman
 1966 Bud Williamson
 1965 Bob Popp
 1964 Bud Williamson
 1963 Bud Williamson
 1962 Bud Williamson
 1961 Bob Popp
 1960 Bud Williamson
 1959 Bud Williamson
 1958 Bud Williamson
 1957 Bud Williamson
 1956 Bud Williamson
 1955 George Getchell
 1954 George Getchell

References

External links 
PGA of America – Nebraska section
Nebraska PGA Championship: Past Champions

Golf in Nebraska
PGA of America sectional tournaments
Recurring sporting events established in 1954
1954 establishments in Nebraska